The Perry River, sometimes referred to as the North Fork of the Eagle River, is a mountain river in the interior of British Columbia, Canada. It flows out of the Monashee Mountains and joins the Eagle River near the town of Malakwa. It is part of the Thompson River system, which drains into the Fraser River.

References

External links 

Rivers of British Columbia